Disneyland Park is a theme park at Disneyland Paris in Marne-la-Vallée, near Paris, France. These are the attractions found in the Disneyland Park.

Main Street, U.S.A. 

 Liberty Arcade (covered walkway)
 Discovery Arcade (covered walkway)
 Horse-Drawn Streetcars ( narrow gauge tramway)
 Main Street Vehicles
 Disneyland Railroad – Main Street Station

Adventureland 

 Le Passage Enchanté d'Aladdin – (Aladdin's Enchanted Passage)
 Adventure Isle
 La Cabane des Robinson – (Swiss Family Treehouse)
 La Plage des Pirates – (Pirates Beach)
 Pirates of the Caribbean
 Pirate Galleon
 Indiana Jones et le Temple du Péril (Indiana Jones and the Temple of Peril)

Former attractions 
 Adventureland Bazaar
 Indiana Jones and the Temple of Peril: Backwards!

Frontierland 

 Big Thunder Mountain
 Phantom Manor (Haunted Mansion)
 The Lion King: Rhythms of the Pride Lands
 Thunder Mesa Riverboat Landing
 Rustler Roundup Shootin' Gallery
 Frontierland Playground
 Disneyland Railroad – Frontierland Depot

Former attractions 
 Cottonwood Creek Ranch
 Woody's Roundup Village
 Frozen Celebration
 Pocahontas Indian Village
 Indian Canoes
 River Rogue Keelboats

Fantasyland 

 Le Château de la Belle au Bois Dormant (Sleeping Beauty Castle)
 La Tanière du Dragon (The Dragon's Lair)
 Le Carrousel de Lancelot (Lancelot's Carousel)
 Blanche-Neige et les Sept Nains (Snow White and the Seven Dwarfs)
 Les Voyages de Pinocchio (Pinocchio's Fantastic Journey)
 Dumbo the Flying Elephant
 Peter Pan's Flight
 Alice's Curious Labyrinth
 Mad Hatter's Tea Cups
 It's a Small World
 Le Pays de Contes de Fées (Storybook Land Canal Boats)
 Casey Jr. – Le Petit Train du Cirque (Casey Jr. Circus Train)
 Meet Mickey Mouse
 Princess Pavilion
 Disneyland Paris Railroad – Fantasyland Station

Former attractions 
 Les Pirouettes du Vieux Moulin
 World Chorus

Discoveryland 

 Buzz Lightyear Laser Blast
 Orbitron – Machines Volantes
 Autopia
 Arcade Beta
 Les Mystères du Nautilus (The Mysteries of the Nautilus)
 Star Wars Hyperspace Mountain
 Star Tours: L'Aventure Continue - Star Tours: The Adventures Continue
 Discoveryland Theatre 
Mickey et son Orchestre PhilharMagique - Mickey's PhilharMagic
 Disneyland Railroad – Discoveryland Station

Former attractions 
 Le Visionarium
 Space Mountain: De la Terre à la Lune (1995-2005)
 Space Mountain: Mission 2 (2005-2017)
 Star Tours
 Discoveryland Theatre
 Captain EO
 Chérie, J'ai Retreci le Public
 Ant-Man Special Sneak Peek
 Star Wars: Path of the Jedi
 Disney and Pixar Shorts Festival

Entertainment 
Disneyland Park hosts a range of daytime and nighttime entertainment throughout the year, although the nighttime entertainment is seasonal.

Current

Normal 
 Disney Stars on Parade – 2017–present
 Dream...and Shine Brighter - 2022-present
 Disney Illuminations: 2017–present
 Mickey's Goodnight Kiss – 2017–2018, 2020–present

Seasonal 
 The Starlit Princess Waltz – 2017–2018 and November 2019-January 2020
 Mickey's Magical Christmas Lights (Christmas season) 2015–present
 Mickey's Halloween Celebration (Halloween season) 2013–present
 Are You Brave Enough? (Halloween season) 2019–present
 Mickey's Dazzling Christmas Parade (Christmas season) 2021–present
 Jungle Book Jive (Festival of the Lion King and Jungle) 2019–present
 Rhythms of the Pride Lands (Festival of the Lion King and Jungle)  2019–present

Retired

Daytime shows 
 Mickey Presents Happy Anniversary Disneyland Paris (2017–2018)
 Jedi Training Academy (2015–2017)
 Chantons La Reine des Neiges - Frozen Sing-Along (2015-2018)
 Tarzan: The Encounter (2000-2008, 2011-2012)
 Winnie the Pooh and Friends, too (1998-2005, 2006-2011)
 Mulan, la Légende (1999-2002)
 Beauty and the Beast (1992-1996)

Nighttime shows 
 Disney Dreams! (2012–2017) (Returning April 2023)
 The Enchanted Fireworks (2008–2012)
 Wishes (2005–2007) (Returned for 1 night 31st December 2022)
 Fantasy in the Sky (1992–2005)

Train parades 
 Disney Characters Express (2007–2009)
 Minnie's Party Train (2009–2010)
 Disney All Stars Express (2010–2011)
 Disney Dance Express (2011–2012)
 Disney's 20th Anniversary Celebration Train (2012–2013)

Parades 
 Disney Magic On Parade (2012–2017)
 Disney's Fantillusion (2003–2012)
 Once Upon a Dream Parade (2007–2012)
 Main Street Electrical Parade (1992–2003)
 Disney ImagiNations Parade (1999–2001)
 The Wonderful World of Disney Parade (1998–1999 and 2001–2007)
 The Hunchback Of Notre Dame Carnival (1997–1998)
 Disney Classics Parade (1992–1997)

Seasonal
 Disney Christmas Parade (Christmas season) (2012–2020)

See also 
 Magical Pride Party

References 

Disneyland Park (Paris)
Disneyland Park (Paris)
Walt Disney Studios Park